The 2016 PEI Tankard, the provincial men's curling championship of Prince Edward Island, was held from January 29 to February 2 at the Charlottetown Curling Complex in Charlottetown, Prince Edward Island. The winning Adam Casey team represented Prince Edward Island at the 2016 Tim Hortons Brier in Ottawa.

As the Casey rink won all three events (A, B & C), no playoff was required.

Teams
The teams are listed as follows:

Knockout Draw Brackets

A Event

B Event

C Event

References

2016 Tim Hortons Brier
Curling competitions in Charlottetown
2016 in Prince Edward Island
January 2016 sports events in Canada
February 2016 sports events in Canada